Adil Douiri (born 16 November 1963 in Rabat) is a Moroccan politician, businessman and venture capitalist.

Personal life 

He is the son of Mhamed Douiri who was also a Minister and a daughter of Ahmed Balafrej. He is also the cousin of Fouad Douiri.

Career 

In 1992, he founded the Casablanca Finance Group. Between 2002 and 2007, he was the Minister of Tourism in the cabinet of Driss Jettou.

See also
Anis Birou

References

Moroccan bankers
Moroccan businesspeople
Living people
People from Rabat
Istiqlal Party politicians
Alumni of Lycée Descartes (Rabat)
1963 births
Government ministers of Morocco